Paul Darren Bacon (born 20 December 1970) is an English former professional footballer who played as a midfielder for Charlton Athletic, making 33 appearances in the Football League. He later played non-league football with Dagenham & Redbridge.

References
General
 . Retrieved 23 January 2014.
Specific

1970 births
Living people
English footballers
People from Forest Gate
Charlton Athletic F.C. players
Dagenham & Redbridge F.C. players
English Football League players
Association football midfielders